Aratama is a Japanese surname. People with this surname include:
, Japanese actress
, Japanese badminton player

See also
Aratama District, which was merged into Inasa District, Shizuoka in 1896
Aratama Maru, Japanese merchant ship launched in 1938

Japanese-language surnames